Virginia Rodrigues (born Salvador, Bahia, March 31, 1964) is a Brazilian singer.

Biography 

Virginia Rodrigues  was born on March 31, 1964. She had started her career by singing in  both Catholic and Protestant church choirs. In 1997, she was invited by the director Márcio Meirelles to attend Pelô Bye Bye. There she was discovered by Caetano Veloso.

The first album Sol Negro (1997) was produced by Celso Fonseca and had arrangements by Eduardo Souto Neto. It was released on the Rykodisc label and was well received in the United States and Europe. The Times of London described Rodrigues as "... The new diva of Brazilian music".  The album also received good reviews in Le Monde and the magazine Rolling Stone. 

Rodrigues second album, Nós, features songs of Ile Aiye, Olodum, Timbalada, Ara Ketu and Afreketê and was also well received, with reviews in The New York Times and All Music Guide. 

Her third album, Mares Profundos, was released in January 2004 on the German label Deutsche Grammophon and features 11 African-sambas composed between 1962 and 1966 by guitarist Baden Powell (1937–2000) and the poet Vinicius de Moraes (1913–1980). The program closes with samba "Lapinha" (Baden-Paulo Cesar Pinheiro). 

Her fourth album, Recomeço, was released in 2008 and features poetry by Chico Buarque.

Rodrigues regularly appears at festivals of jazz and world music throughout the world, participating in several world tours. Former U.S. president Bill Clinton once said that she was the singer who he liked best in the world and mentioned her in his memoir My Life.

Discography 
Albums
 Sol Negro (1997)
 Nós (2000)
 Mares Profundos (2004)
 Recomeço (2008)
 Mama Kalunga (2015)
 Cada Voz E Uma Mulher (2019)

Contributing artist
 Unwired: Latin America (2001, World Music Network)

Filmography

References

External links 
 Listen
 Virginia Rodrigues Matrix Page
 Michael Church, "Virginia Rodrigues: The diva of the favelas", The Independent, 12 March 2004.

Living people
21st-century Brazilian women singers
21st-century Brazilian singers
1964 births
20th-century Brazilian women singers
20th-century Brazilian singers